Hongyu, represented by its type species Hongyu chowi, is an extinct Devonian lobe-finned fish. About 1.5 m in length, it resembles both Elpistostegalia and Rhizodontida, making its phylogenetic placement uncertain. The type specimen was discovered in the Zhongning Formation near Ningxia in China’s North China Block.

References

Tetrapodomorphs
Prehistoric lobe-finned fish genera
Devonian bony fish
Prehistoric animals of China